Freedom Center may refer to:

 Freedom Center (Chicago), an American newspaper production facility

Freedom Center (Omaha), an American newspaper production facility 
Freedom Center (TSA), operation center of the United States Transportation Security Administration
National Underground Railroad Freedom Center, a museum in Cincinnati, Ohio, USA
International Freedom Center, a proposed museum in New York City, USA
David Horowitz Freedom Center, an American political organisation

See also
Freedom House
Freedom Tower (disambiguation)